Gabriel Bonnot de Mably (Grenoble, 14 March 1709 – 2 April 1785 in Paris), sometimes known as Abbé de Mably, was a French philosopher, historian, and writer, who for a short time served in the diplomatic corps.  He was a popular 18th-century writer.

Biography

Gabriel Bonnot was born at Mably, Loire into a family that belonged to the Noblesse de robe or Nobles of the Robe. This class formed the Second Estate whose rank derived from holding judicial or administrative posts and were often hard-working professionals, unlike the aristocratic Noblesse d'épée or Nobles of the Sword.  He and his older brother Jean added "de Mably" to their names; his younger brother Étienne used another family property, at Condillac, Drôme. As 'Condillac', he also became a noted writer and philosopher.

Gabriel and his brothers were educated in an institution run by the Society of Jesus or Jesuits; he enrolled in a seminary at Saint-Sulpice. In 1742, he became a confidant of Cardinal Tencin, then Minister of State without Portfolio, for whom he carried out various diplomatic roles during the 1740 to 1748 War of the Austrian Succession. They included negotiating an alliance with Prussia in 1743 and preparing terms for the 1746 Congress of Breda, which sought to agree a separate peace with Britain. However, he fell out with Cardinal Tencin and thereafter focused on scholarly pursuits.

Based on the recommendation of Françoise-Louise de Warens, in April 1740, Mably's older brother Jean employed the 28-year-old Jean-Jacques Rousseau as tutor for his two oldest sons. Rousseau produced two short works addressed to Jean de Mably: "Memorandum Presented to Monsieur de Mably on the Education of Monsieur His Son" and the shorter "Plan for the Education of Monsieur de Sainte-Marie". These outline a proposed system of education for Jean de Mably's sons and also present one of his earliest public self-reflections and self-justifications. By summer 1741, Rousseau realized he was ill-suited to the position and the two agreed to end his employment, parting on friendly terms.

The historian Leo Damrosch explains that at this time, Abbé de Mably

had just published a treatise comparing Roman institutions of government with French ones and celebrating the progress of civilization ... Conversing with Mably, Condillac, [and friends he had met at Lyon's reading club] Parisot, Bordes, and their friends, Rousseau found himself in a stimulating intellectual milieu, and the studies he had put himself through in Chambéry suddenly came to life.

Rousseau would remain lifelong friends with Mably and his family. Both Mably and his brother Condillac visited Rousseau when he moved to Montmorency, Val-d'Oise. Rousseau later reflected upon his experience tutoring Jean de Mably's sons in The Confessions.

Influence

In 1909, the anarchist Peter Kropotkin credited Mably several achievements: he is credited with being responsible for why the study of politics, constitutions, and elective representation in the 18th century was so popular, with inspiring the egalitarian, communal, and anti-inequality ethos of the French Revolution, and for being an early advocate of communist or communal possession of the land.

Writings
Mably's most well-known work is Entretiens de Phocion, a dialogue first published in 1763, which introduced themes of his mature thought. Two of his works were published posthumously and they had a profound effect on the early deliberations on the assembly of the Estates-General of 1789: an enlarged version of his Histoire de France (first published in 1765), which was published in May 1789 to great acclaim. Authorities tried unsuccessfully to suppress it by confiscating many copies. Secondly, Des droits et des devoirs du citoyen, written in 1758, was also published after his death. He warned against events that later developed during the French Revolution.

These two works were seen to contribute to the later concepts of both communism and republicanism. He advocated the abolition of private property, which he saw as incompatible with sympathy and altruism, and conductive only to one's antisocial or egotistical instincts. Mably's writings contain a paradox: he praises elitist Plato, but also the enlightened Stoic views on natural human equality. Mably went further than the traditional Stoic argument that all men possessed a divine spark. He also went beyond the liberal concept of equality before the law, and argued for the equality of needs. He argued that virtue was more valued than the acquisition or possession of material wealth, and criticized idleness. He found an audience among those who were critical of the inherited wealth and privilege of the nobility, who did no work.

Mably's complete works were published in 15 volumes in 1794–1795, with an obituary/biography by Gabriel Brizard.

List of 18 published works by Gabriel Bonnot de Mably
(1709–1785)

Posthumous publications of individual works, published in 1786-1794

Posthumous Complete works to 1795

Recent Translations in English by Simon de Vries
 Concerning the Rights & Duties of the Citizen – Comtal Publications, 2008 – 
 Letters to Madame the Marchioness of P **** on the Opera – Comtal Publications, 2010 –

References

Further reading
 Johnson Kent Wright, A Classical Republican in Eighteenth-Century France: The Political Thought of Mably  (Stanford University Press, 1997).
 V. I. Guerrier, L'Abbé de Mably, moraliste et politique (Paris: 1886)
 Mably's work is catalogued at the French National Library
 Charles Philippe Dijon de Monteton, Der lange Schatten des Abbé Bonnot de Mably. Divergenzen und Analogien seines Denkens in der Politischen Theorie des Grafen Sieyès, in: Thiele, U. (ed.): Volkssouveränität und Freiheitsrechte. Emmanuel Joseph Sieyes' Staatsverständnis, Nomos, Baden-Baden, 2009, S. 43–110
 Ernest A. Whitfield, Gabriel Bonnot De Mably.  (London, UK: George Routledge and Sons, 1930, reprinted as New York, NY: Augustus M. Kelley Publishers, 1969).

External links
 The French Revolution and the Socialist Tradition: Early French Communists, History Guide
 Conversations with Phocion: the political thought of Mably, History of Political Thought, 1992, vol. 13, no. 3, pp. 391–415(25), JK Wright, abstract only
 [./Https://www.gutenberg.org/ebooks/author/47301 Works At Project Gutenberg In French] 

1709 births
1785 deaths
Writers from Grenoble
Enlightenment philosophers
French untitled nobility
18th-century French philosophers
18th-century French historians
Proto-socialists
18th-century socialists